The sack of Athens in 267 AD was carried out by the Heruli, a Germanic tribe that had invaded the Balkans at the time. Despite the recent fortification of Athens with a new city wall, the Heruli succeeded in capturing the city and laid much of it waste, before they were driven out by the Athenians under the leadership of the historian Dexippus. The event left lasting damage to the city's monuments and stoas, and Athens lost its ancient glory and eminence, shrinking to the area around the Roman Agora, which was enclosed with a new wall.

References

Sources
 
 

260s conflicts
260s in the Roman Empire
267
3rd century in Greece
Athens 267
Heruli
Roman Athens
Athens 267